The 1994 Italy rugby union tour of Australia was a series of matches played in June 1994 in Australia by Italy national rugby union team.

Results 
Scores and results list Italy's points tally first.

References
 
 

Italy
tour
Italy national rugby union team tours
tour
Rugby union tours of Australia